Ralph William John Brown (born 18 June 1957) is an English actor and writer, known for playing Danny the drug dealer in Withnail and I, the security guard Aaron (a.k.a. "85") in Alien 3, DJ Bob Silver in The Boat That Rocked aka Pirate Radio, super-roadie Del Preston in Wayne's World 2, the pilot Ric Olié in Star Wars: Episode I – The Phantom Menace and Henry Clinton in Turn: Washington's Spies. He won The Samuel Beckett Award for his first play Sanctuary written for Joint Stock Theatre Company in 1987, and the Raindance and Sapporo Film Festival awards for his first screenplay for the British film New Year's Day in 2001.

Early life
Brown was born in Cambridge, the son of Heather R. and John F. W. Brown. He has a younger brother, Paul. He lived in Portsmouth, Hampshire until the age of seven, then moved to East Sussex where he attended Lewes Priory School. He graduated from the London School of Economics and Political Science with a Bachelor of Laws (LL.B) in 1979.

Career

Films
His film roles include Dil's on-off boyfriend Dave in the Academy Award-winning film The Crying Game, Danny the drug dealer in Withnail & I, Great Train Robber Ronnie Biggs in Buster, roadie Del Preston in Wayne's World 2, teacher and rugby league player Phil in Up 'n' Under, prison guard captain Mr Burton in Mean Machine, Sgt Major Harris in the Paul Schrader film Dominion: Prequel to the Exorcist, and CIA renegade Mr Collins alongside Wesley Snipes in The Contractor. In 1997, Brown appeared in Steven Spielberg's slavery epic Amistad. In 2007, he was cast in Caught in the Act, an independent British film. 
Brown starred as DJ Bob Silver in The Boat That Rocked aka Pirate Radio (2009), written and directed by Richard Curtis; Huge directed by Ben Miller (2009), The Kid (2010), directed by Nick Moran; Mission: London, a Bulgarian comedy directed by Dimitar Mitoviski which premiered in Sofia on 13 April 2010, and Sus (2010), written by Barrie Keeffe and directed by Robert Heath. He worked on the film Killing Bono (2010) and the feature film Dark Tide (2010) in Cape Town, opposite Halle Berry, I, Anna (2011) with Gabriel Byrne and Charlotte Rampling, then went on to work on Tower Block (2012) in London, Jack the Giant Slayer (2013) directed by Bryan Singer, and Stoker (2013) in Nashville, directed by Park Chan-wook. In 2016 he was cast in Final Score in West Ham United's recently abandoned Boleyn Ground with Dave Bautista, directed by Scott Mann. He worked with Will Smith in Ang Lee's Gemini Man (2019).

Television
Among TV appearances, Brown appeared as PC Pete Muswell in The Bill from 1985 to 1986; guest starred as Captain Carlisle in A Touch of Frost in 1996; appeared in Dennis Potter's Karaoke in 1995; portrayed Prince John in the BBC's adaptation of Sir Walter Scott's Ivanhoe in 1997; appeared as John Geddes in the ITV post-apocalyptic drama serial The Last Train; appeared as the moustachioed policeman Wintersgill in the Channel 4/Showtime series Cape Wrath; and did a memorable turn as shaven-headed gang-boss "Miami Vice" in the 2000 series Lock, Stock...The Series.

In 2005, he appeared in Coronation Street as Barney, roadie to Status Quo, and with Julia Davis in the cult TV sitcom Nighty Night as perverted new-age sex therapist Jacques. In 2007, he appeared in the final two episodes of Life on Mars as Frank Morgan, an interim DCI in 1973 sequences, and Sam's (John Simm's) surgeon in 2006 sequences.

Brown played Sarah Solemani's father in Him & Her, which began airing in 2010 and continued through 2014 for BBC Three comedy, winning a BAFTA for the final series, "The Wedding." In 2012, he worked on Inspector George Gently with Martin Shaw, The Poison Tree for ITV, and The Mimic for C4.  In 2013, he worked on the aborted Marvin Gaye film Sexual Healing directed by Julian Temple, and the ABC series The Assets in Vilnius, Lithuania. In 2014, he was cast in Babylon for C4 and Elementary for CBS, followed by TURN: Washington's Spies for AMC, playing General Sir Henry Clinton, leader of the redcoats. Brown returned for seasons 3 and 4 of the series. He also played Johann Fennhoff (Dr Faustus), in Agent Carter for Marvel, and guest starred on Blacklist.

In 2015 Brown starred in all ten episodes of Legends with Sean Bean, with whom he had worked on Extremely Dangerous in the early 1990s. In 2016-17 he returned to Prague with showrunner Ken Biller to shoot Genius: Einstein for Nat Geo, which premiered at the Tribeca Film Festival in April 2017.

In June 2016, Brown played the role of Bob Clay in the BBC film Reg.

In September 2017 Brown travelled to Guadeloupe for a guest role in the BBC show Death In Paradise.

In 2021, Brown portrayed former U.S. President Lyndon Johnson in two episodes of Godfather of Harlem, a series on EPIX which explores the intersection between the criminal underworld and civil rights movement in the 1960s.

Theatre

Brown starred as IRA Commander Jimmy Muldoon in the Tony Award winning Broadway play The Ferryman at the Bernard B. Jacobs Theatre from 19 February until 7 July 2019.

In his early years, Brown was involved with the Moving Parts Theatre Company with Rachel Feldberg, Ruth Mackenzie, Anita Lewton, and Saffron Myers. John Godber adapted A Clockwork Orange for Man In The Moon, King's Road, then Brown appeared in West written & directed by Steven Berkoff at the Donmar for five months (also shot for C4).  Followed by Royal Court Theatre "Panic", Joint Stock "Deadlines", The RSC "Earwig" by Paula Milne, and The Everyman in Liverpool playing the title role in Macbeth.  Retired from the stage shortly thereafter, and returned briefly 20 years later at The Bush Theatre to play guitar in punk play The Dysfunkshonalz by writer Mike Packer. After only one play in 30 years Brown joined The Ferryman company on Broadway in February 2019 which won four Tony Awards for Best Play, Best Director, Best Set Design and Best Costume.

As a writer

Ralph Brown wrote the play Sanctuary for Joint Stock Theatre Company in 1987 which toured the UK and won the Samuel Beckett Award in 1987 for best first play.

The No-Neck Monsters Theatre Company brought the playwright and actor to Washington, D.C. from London to adapt his 1987 Samuel Beckett Award-winning new play Sanctuary.  Re-written as a rap musical for the "No Necks", the show became a successful and controversial production capturing homelessness, runaways and crack hitting the streets of D.C. Scott Davenport Richards wrote the music for the rap musical and it was directed by Gwendolyn Wynne.  The first rap musical in the region The Washington Post, NPR, American Theatre Magazine and McNeil/Lehrer Newshour amongst others reported on the production. The production was nominated for three Helen Hayes Awards: Outstanding Resident Musical, Outstanding Lead Actress (Deidre L. Johnson) in a Resident Musical, and Outstanding Sound Design. Performers featured were Teagle F. Bougere, Erik Todd Dellums, Paul G. Griffin, Deidra L. Johnson, Helen Patton and Barbara Robinson.

Writing

Brown has written two plays, both rap musicals:  Sanctuary for Joint Stock Theatre Company (Samuel Beckett Award 1987), adapted for the stage in Washington, D.C., as Sanctuary D.C. produced by No-Neck Monsters Theatre Company (three nominations for Helen Hayes Award 1988).  His second play The House That Crack Built has never been produced.

Brown wrote the screenplay for the film New Year's Day directed by Suri Krishnamma in 1999, released in 2001 after screening at Sundance Film Festival and winning Raindance Film Festival award in 2001 and Sapporo Film Festival in the same year.

Brown also wrote the screenplays for the abandoned films Red Light Runners, High Times and In God's Footsteps.

He was a regular contributor to the Readers Recommend music blog in The Guardian, now at Song-Bar.com

Social media
Brown joined Twitter in November 2008.

His blog My Pop Life is at https://magicmenagerie.wordpress.com/

Personal life
Brown has been married to actress Jenny Jules since 1992. He lives in New York City.

Filmography

References

External links

https://twitter.com/Ralphwjbrown

1957 births
British expatriate male actors in the United States
English dramatists and playwrights
English expatriates in the United States
English male film actors
English screenwriters
English male screenwriters
English male television actors
Living people
Alumni of the London School of Economics
Musicians from Cambridgeshire
Male actors from Cambridgeshire
Musicians from Sussex
Male actors from Sussex
English male dramatists and playwrights
People educated at Priory School, Lewes
People from Cambridge
20th-century English male actors
21st-century English male actors
21st-century British male musicians